CyberWorld is a 2000 American 3D animated anthology film shown in IMAX and IMAX 3D, presented by Intel. Several segments originally filmed in 2-D were converted to 3-D format. The film was cited as the first 3D animated film, as presented on its website.

Plot
Phig commences the movie by showing the audience the "CyberWorld", a futuristic museum of infinite possibilities. Meanwhile, three computer bugs (Buzzed, Wired, and Frazzled) come and try to eat the CyberWorld through its number coding. When Phig knows about them and hunts for the destructive computer bugs, she presents various short stock clips of computer animated productions, such as scenes from Antz and episodes of The Simpsons post-converted to 3D.

In the end, Buzzed, Wired and Frazzled create a black hole (akin to "Homer³"), which inexplicitly leads to their deaths for all the trouble they have caused. Phig is nearly swallowed up as well, but not before her "knight in cyber armor" technician Hank reboots the entire system just as she is sucked into the vortex. Phig concludes the movie by explaining to the audience that none of the events caused by the bugs ever occurred. To prove her point, she attempts to summon her battle gear, only to receive a pink bunny outfit in return (a similar trick the bugs played on her in the film's midsection).

Selected segments
 The dance sequence from the animated feature Antz
 The CGI parts of the "Homer³" segment from The Simpsons episode "Treehouse of Horror VI"
 The music video of the Pet Shop Boys song "Liberation"
 "Monkey Brain Sushi", a short film created by Sony Pictures Imageworks
 KraKKen: Adventure of Future Ocean, a short film created by ExMachina
 "Joe Fly", a short film created By Spans & Partner
 "Flipbook And Waterfall city", a short film created by Satoshi Kitahara
 "Tonight's Performance", a short film created by REZN8

Cast

 Jenna Elfman as Phig
 Matt Frewer as Frazzled
 Robert Smith as Buzzed and Wired
 Dave Foley as Hank the Technician
 Cara Pifko as Computer
 Woody Allen, Sharon Stone, and Sylvester Stallone (Antz)
 Hank Azaria, Nancy Cartwright, Dan Castellaneta, Julie Kavner, Harry Shearer, and Yeardley Smith of The Simpsons
 Chris Lowe and Neil Tennant of Pet Shop Boys
  David Geldart as Pete
 Richard Pearce as Joe Fly
  Ned Irving as Sanchez
  Mark Lyndon as The Praying Mantis
  Georg Hahn as The Mites
 Frank Welker as The Firefly

Release
CyberWorld premiered at the Universal Citywalk IMAX Theater on October 1, 2000. It is the first IMAX film to have a PG rating (some language from the Antz and Simpsons segments).

Reception

Box office
CyberWorld was a box office success, grossing $11,253,900 in the domestic box office and $5,400,000 overseas for a worldwide total of $16,653,900.

Critical response
On Rotten Tomatoes it has an approval rating of 55% based on 11 reviews, with an average rating of 6.18/10. On Metacritic, the film has a weighted average score of 53/100 based on 13 critics, indicating "mixed or average reviews".

Roger Ebert, writing for the Chicago Sun-Times, praised the film for accurately presenting what 3D technology is capable of. He particularly singled out the size of the IMAX screens the film was projected on. He went on to write, "(The film) takes advantage of the squarish six-story screen to envelop us in the images; the edges of the frame don't have the same kind of distracting cutoff power they possess in the smaller rectangles of conventional theaters."

Contrarily, Paul Tatara of CNN.com was displeased with the film's over-reliance on 3D effects, continuing on to say, "Unfortunately, you can't escape the sensation that you might end up wearing the contents of your stomach while you watch it."

See also
IMAX 3D Cinema (2006)

References

External links
 
 
 
 
 
 CYBERWORLD

2000 films
2000 3D films
2000 comedy films
2000 short films
American 3D films
2000s English-language films
American anthology films
IMAX short films
American comedy short films
3D animated short films
Films scored by Paul Haslinger
Films scored by Hummie Mann
2000s American films